USS Portunus is a name used more than once by the U.S. Navy:

 , laid down as LST–330 by the Philadelphia Naval Shipyard, 12 November 1942.
 , laid down by the Federal Shipbuilding and Drydock Co., Newark, New Jersey, as LSM–275 1 August 1944.

United States Navy ship names